Čaba Silađi (born 23 August 1990) is a Serbian swimmer of Hungarian ethnicity. Silađi mainly competes in the breaststroke.

Silađi's hometown Senta is a centre of Hungarians in Vojvodina, though competing for Serbia, Silađi goes by the Serbian form of his name. His name also appears transliterated as Caba Siladji in English sports sources.

Career 
Silađi finished elementary school and gymnasium in Bečej. He began to practice swimming since 1997, and until 2004 he also trained water polo alongside. He lives and trains in Zrenjanin.

His first international competition was European Short Course Swimming Championships 2007 in Debrecen. He made a lot of remarkable results at World and European junior championships. At the 2008 FINA Youth World Swimming Championships he won silver (50m breaststroke) and bronze medal (100m breaststroke).

He was in the Serbian team at the 2008 Summer Olympics in Beijing. At the 2009 Mediterranean Games in Pescara he won silver (100m breaststroke) and bronze medal (50m breaststroke). Silađi competed at 2009 Summer Universiade in Belgrade, and won bronze medal at 50m breaststroke. He also participated in the semifinals at the 2009 World Aquatics Championships in Rome and 2010 European Aquatics Championships in Budapest.

At the 2009 European Short Course Swimming Championships he won his first senior medal, bronze in the 50 breaststroke.

Silađi also competed at the 2012 Summer Olympics in London and the 2016 Summer Olympics in Rio de Janeiro.

See also
 List of swimmers
 List of European Short Course Swimming Championships medalists (men)
 List of Serbian records in swimming

References

External links
 
 
 
 
  (archive)

1990 births
Living people
Hungarians in Vojvodina
Serbian male swimmers
Olympic swimmers of Serbia
Swimmers at the 2008 Summer Olympics
Swimmers at the 2012 Summer Olympics
Swimmers at the 2016 Summer Olympics
Male breaststroke swimmers
Serbian male freestyle swimmers
People from Senta
Mediterranean Games silver medalists for Serbia
Mediterranean Games bronze medalists for Serbia
Swimmers at the 2009 Mediterranean Games
Swimmers at the 2013 Mediterranean Games
Swimmers at the 2018 Mediterranean Games
Universiade medalists in swimming
Mediterranean Games medalists in swimming
Universiade gold medalists for Serbia
Universiade bronze medalists for Serbia
Medalists at the 2015 Summer Universiade
Medalists at the 2009 Summer Universiade
Swimmers at the 2020 Summer Olympics